Luc Laventure ( 1 February 1945 – 6 March 2022) was a French journalist and the director of France Ô and La Première from 1998 to 2011.

Luc born in France and worked in public broadcasting from 1967. He spent most of his career at FR3 Martinique and RFO. He has always worked for the promotion and visibility of the overseas territories in the French audiovisual sector.

Laventure died on 6 March 2022, at the age of 77.

References 

1945 births
2022 deaths
21st-century French journalists
French male journalists
French television executives
Chevaliers of the Légion d'honneur
Martiniquais people